Smilin' Buddha Cabaret is an album by Canadian rock band 54-40. The album is named after a live music club in Vancouver, British Columbia. The club's iconic neon sign, now found at the Museum of Vancouver, is featured on the album's cover. The singles released from the album were "Blame Your Parents", "Assoholic", "Ocean Pearl" and "Radio Luv Song".

Track listing
 "Blame Your Parents"  – 4:26
 "Radio Luv Song"  – 2:08
 "Assoholic"  – 3:39
 "Daisy"  – 2:17
 "Once a Killer"  – 3:46
 "Punk Grass"  – 2:35
 "Lucy"  – 3:04
 "Beyond the Outsider"  – 3:27
 "Don't Listen to That"  – 2:27
 "Ocean Pearl"  – 3:25
 "Higher"  – 2:32
 "Friends End"  – 4:06
 "What Buddy Was"  – 4:24
 "Save Yourself"  – 4:05

References

1994 albums
54-40 albums